Victor Randiki Ochieng (born 20 March 1991) is a Kenyan former footballer who played as a striker.

Career
Born in Nairobi, Ochieng played club football for KCB, Chemelil Sugar, A.F.C. Leopards, SoNy Sugar, Posta Rangers and Western Stima.

He earned 2 caps for the Kenyan national team.

References

1991 births
Living people
Kenyan footballers
Kenya international footballers
Kenya Commercial Bank S.C. players
Chemelil Sugar F.C. players
A.F.C. Leopards players
SoNy Sugar F.C. players
Posta Rangers F.C. players
Western Stima F.C. players
Association football forwards